Oskar Nowak may refer to:
 Oskar Nowak (hockey), Austrian ice hockey and field hockey player
 Oskar Nowak (footballer), Polish footballer